Darren Kingdon (born 24 September 1969) is an Australian cricketer. He played in seven first-class matches for Queensland between 1992 and 1994.

See also
 List of Queensland first-class cricketers

References

External links
 

1969 births
Living people
Australian cricketers
Queensland cricketers
People from Dubbo
Cricketers from New South Wales